Jean-Luc Bertrand-Krajewski is a professor at INSA Lyon and Head of the DEEP Laboratory.

Career 
Bertrand-Krajewski got his PhD in 1992. His research has focussed on Urban Drainage processes, modelling and monitoring. In his capacity as researcher, Bertrand-Krajewski is also a member of the Société hydrotechnique de France (SHF) and was president of GRAIE, the organisation behind the Novatech conferences. On an international level, Bertrand-Krajewksi has been an elected member, chair and associate member of the Joint Committee Urban Drainage, a Fellow for the IWA, member of the Board of Directors of IWA Publishing and a member of the editorial board of the Urban Water Journal.

In 2021, Betrand-Krajewski published a book on Metrology of Urban Drainage System: Plug and Pray  together with researchers from the TU Delft and other partners from the Urban Drainage community. According to Semantic Scholar, Betrand-Krajewski has published over 130 scientific articles with a h-index of 31 and 4118 citations, which is comparable to the figures given on ResearchGate. On his personal website, Betrand-Krajewksi lists 89 internationally peer-reviewed publications, 28 peer reviewed papers in national journals (French), 16 additional publications in French and 248 contributions to national and international conferences

References 

French academics
University of Strasbourg alumni
Year of birth missing (living people)
Living people